Sanjiv may refer to:
Sanjiv Ahuja, Indian entrepreneur
Sanjiv Chaturvedi, Indian Forest Service officer
Sanjiv Chopra, Indian American physician
Sanjiv Sam Gambhir, Indian-American physician
Sanjiv Goenka, Indian entrepreneur
Sanjiv Jaiswal, Indian film director 
Sanjiv Kumar, Indian politician
Sanjiv Mehta (Indian businessman), Chairman & Managing Director of Hindustan Unilever Limited (Unilever's Indian subsidiary)
Sanjiv Mehta (British businessman), founder of The East India Company established in 2010
 Sanjiv Kumar (politician), Indian politician
Sanjiv Sidhu, Software entrepreneur 
 Sanjiv Khanna, Indian judge